Citadel Station may refer to:

Stations
 Carlisle Citadel station, the original name of Carlisle railway station, England
 Leith Citadel railway station, a former station in Leith, Scotland

Fiction
 Citadel Station, a space station orbiting Saturn in the video game System Shock

 Citadel, a space station in the Mass Effect video game series; see Mass Effect 3: Citadel

See also
 Citadel (disambiguation)